Eduardo Serrano may refer to:

 Eduardo Serrano (musician) (1911–2008), Venezuelan musician, conductor and composer
 Eduardo Serrano (actor) (born 1942), Venezuelan actor